The Yellowknife Highway, officially Northwest Territories Highway 3 and also known as the Great Slave Highway, is a highway connecting Yellowknife, Northwest Territories, to the Mackenzie Highway, from a junction  north of the Alberta border. First completed in 1960 as a gravel and dirt road, the highway is now paved and realigned after years of work concluded in 2006. Access to Yellowknife prior to the opening of the Yellowknife Highway was possible only by airplane, winter road, or boat across Great Slave Lake.

The highway also connects with Behchokǫ̀ (formerly Rae-Edzo) and Fort Providence.

Crossing the Mackenzie River (just south of Fort Providence) between 1960 and November 2012 required a ferry service (May–January) and ice bridge (December to March). Transportation was interrupted in the spring for approximately five weeks when the ice bridge became unsafe but ice conditions prevented safe ferry operations.  The ferry-vessel Johnny Berens served from 1961 to 1972, and the MV Merv Hardie served from 1972 to 2012.

The Deh Cho Bridge opened on November 30, 2012, and replaced the ferry/ice bridge. Trucks pay tolls on northbound crossings, with pre-registered trucks using an electronic device being charged automatically. Private passenger vehicles do not pay a toll. Estimated costs have more than tripled since 2003. In 2022, the Tłı̨chǫ All-Season Road will open as a branch from the Yellowknife Highway.

Major intersections

References

Northwest Territories territorial highways